The NMDC Hyderabad Marathon, is an annual marathon competition held in Hyderabad every year. It is the second largest marathon in India after the Mumbai Marathon

History
The culture of marathon running was begun as a non-profit organization in 2007. Airtel was the title sponsor of the race for more than a decade, starting from the 2011 edition. In 2022, a Hyderabad based public sector unit NMDC became the title sponsor.

Past winners
Key:

References

Marathons in India
Sport in Hyderabad, India
Recurring sporting events established in 2011
2011 establishments in Andhra Pradesh